Granados is a municipality in the Baja Verapaz department of Guatemala. It was named after former Guatemalan president Miguel García Granados in 1893.

General information 
Granados is located at the base of the Chuacus Mountains, in the river Motagua gorge, and is the farthest municipality from Baja Verapaz capital, Salamá It was named after former president general Miguel García Granados, leader of the Liberal Revolution in 1871, by a decree signed on 13 January 1893, by president general José María Reina Barrios.

It has a surface of approximately 248 km2 and is famous in the region for its Rosa de Jamaica and Tamarindo beverages.

Population 
Granados has a population of 10,096 according to the 1994 Census of the Statistics National Institute, with 10% being natives and the rest ladinos.

Main religious celebrations 
Granados celebrated its main Catholic celebration on 29 June, in honor of its former saint patron, Saint Peter, from 1960 to 2000, but since the settlement of the Granados' Black Christ, the latter became its official saint patron, and Granados started celebration on 15 January.  However, starting in 2015 Granados decided to have two celebrations: one in June in honor of Saint Peter, saint patron of the town of Granandos and another on January, in honor of the Black Christ of Granados, saint patron of the municipality.

Climate

Granados has a tropical savanna climate (Köppen: Aw).

Geographic location
Granados is located in the south of Baja Verapaz Department, 35 miles away from Guatemala City.

See also
 
 
 Baja Verapaz
 Miguel García Granados
 List of places in Guatemala

Notes and references

References

Bibliography 

 
 
 

Municipalities of the Baja Verapaz Department